Don McBrearty is a Canadian film director.

Career

In 2003 McBrearty directed the made for television drama film Sex and the Single Mom. It tells the story of Jess Gradwell (Gail O'Grady), a single and overly concerned mother of a 15-year-old girl, Sara (Danielle Panabaker). She becomes even more over protective when Sara tells her about thinking of having sex with her new boyfriend. The things between Sara and Jess start to change when Jess begins an affair with a newly single doctor.

He directed the sequel to Sex and the Single Mom, entitled More Sex and the Single Mom, released in 2005 with O'Grady reprising her role as Jess. The film focuses on Jess's life as a mother of a teenage daughter and a three-year-old son, as well as her increasingly complicated love and sex life. In an interview with The Tuscaloosa News, O'Grady admitted that she had been "pleasantly surprised" when she was informed that there would be a sequel, and stated that the ending of the second film left the door open for future sequels.

Filmography

Film and Television

References

External links

Canadian film directors
Canadian television directors
Year of birth missing (living people)
Living people